St. John's Catholic Church, built in 1915, is a historic Carpenter Gothic style Roman Catholic church building located in Paxton, Dickens Township near Dallas, Gregory County, South Dakota. Its steep roof, lancet windows and belfry and entrance are typical of Carpenter Gothic churches. In 1973 it was closed but a year later it was given to a group of former parishioners who agreed to maintain it and its adjoining cemetery. The church and the cemetery are the only remnants of the former community of Paxton.

 
On November 20, 2009, the church was added to the National Register of Historic Places.

See also
  Rootsweb list of cemeteries in Gregory County, SD

References

Roman Catholic churches completed in 1915
20th-century Roman Catholic church buildings in the United States
Churches on the National Register of Historic Places in South Dakota
Former Roman Catholic church buildings in South Dakota
Churches in Gregory County, South Dakota
Carpenter Gothic church buildings in South Dakota
Architecture in South Dakota
Cemeteries in South Dakota
Churches in the Roman Catholic Diocese of Rapid City
National Register of Historic Places in Gregory County, South Dakota
1915 establishments in South Dakota